Naomi Maike Schnittger (born 6 April 1994) is a German Paralympic swimmer. She represented Germany at the 2012 Summer Paralympics and at the 2016 Summer Paralympics and she won the silver medal in the women's 50 metre freestyle S12 event in 2016.

References

External links 
 
 
  

1994 births
Living people
German female freestyle swimmers
Paralympic swimmers of Germany
Paralympic silver medalists for Germany
Paralympic medalists in swimming
Swimmers at the 2012 Summer Paralympics
Swimmers at the 2016 Summer Paralympics
Medalists at the 2016 Summer Paralympics
Medalists at the World Para Swimming Championships
Medalists at the World Para Swimming European Championships
S12-classified Paralympic swimmers
20th-century German women
21st-century German women